The Hyde Park Historic Districts are U.S. Historic Districts (designated as such on March 4, 1985) located in Tampa, Florida. They are bounded by the Hillsborough River, Hillsborough Bay, Howard Avenue, and Kennedy Boulevard. They contain 1,264 buildings, including the Hutchinson House and the Anderson-Frank House.

References

External links
 Hillsborough County listings at National Register of Historic Places
 Map of Hyde Park Historic District

National Register of Historic Places in Tampa, Florida
Historic districts on the National Register of Historic Places in Florida